Bronisława Ludwichowska (born 18 September 1951) is a Polish former distance runner who won the 1977 Women's Cinque Mulini cross-country race.  She followed up a sixth-place finish at the 1974 IAAF World Cross Country Championships with a two medal performance in the following year's championships; winning an individual silver medal and a team bronze medal.  Her silver medal time of 13:47 edged out third-place finisher, Carmen Valero of Spain by one second.

References

Polish female long-distance runners
Polish athletics coaches
1951 births
Living people
Place of birth missing (living people)
20th-century Polish women
21st-century Polish women